Seki is a village in the Osmancık District of Çorum Province in Turkey. Its population is 49 (2022).

References

Villages in Osmancık District